Dean Robinson (born 12 November 1989) is a New Zealand first-class cricketer who plays for Central Districts.

References

External links
 

1989 births
Living people
New Zealand cricketers
Central Districts cricketers
Cricketers from Taranaki